Graham Charles Stuart (born 12 March 1962) is a British politician. A member of the Conservative Party, he has been the Member of Parliament for Beverley and Holderness since 2005 and served as Parliamentary Under-Secretary of State for Exports from 2018 to 2021, and Minister of State for Europe from July to September 2022.

Education
Graham Stuart was born in Carlisle, Cumbria, and studied at Glenalmond College, an independent school in Perthshire, followed by Selwyn College, Cambridge, from 1982 to 1985, where he read Philosophy and Law but failed his degree, after focusing his efforts on developing his "What's on in Cambridge" guide into a profitable business and remains non-executive chairman of the company.

He was Chairman of the Cambridge University Conservative Association during Easter 1985.

Early political career in Cambridge
He was elected as a member of Cambridge City Council for the Cherry Hinton Ward in the 1998 local elections. He contested the Cambridge constituency as the Conservative Party candidate at the 2001 general election, coming in third place with 9,829 votes, 23% of the share. He was re-elected to Cambridge City Council in the 2002 local elections and served until 2004.

Parliamentary career
Stuart was elected to the House of Commons as Member of Parliament (MP) for Beverley and Holderness in the 2005 general election with a majority of 2,580. Following his election, he said "I plan to be upfront and have a high profile, not only within the constituency but nationally". He sat as a member of two select committees; the Environmental Audit Select Committee and the Children, Schools and Families Select Committee. He was elected a member of the Conservative Party Board by his fellow MPs in 2006.  He was elected as chair of the Education Select Committee in June 2010.

In 2005, he founded Beverley and Holderness Pensioners Action Group, Community Hospitals Acting Nationally Together (CHANT), a cross-party campaign group and Hull and Holderness Opposing the Incinerator (HOTI Group). He is vice-chairman of the GLOBE UK branch of Global Legislators Organisation for a Balanced Environment. Following the Parliamentary expenses scandal, Stuart defended his expenses in June 2009, which included spending £426 on bed linen and towels.

His successful campaigns in the 2005–10 Parliament included the defeat of legislation on home education and saving the Beverley Pasture Masters. In the following  parliament, he was involved in the successful campaign for lower Humber Bridge tolls, and successfully persuaded the government to improve the A164 and construct the Beverley Bypass. In 2012, he defeated a proposed increase in VAT on static caravans, which are largely manufactured in the East Riding of Yorkshire.

In June 2010, Stuart was elected by MPs as Chair of the Education Select Committee. Despite being a Conservative MP, Stuart frequently disagreed with the Secretary of State for Education Michael Gove. His Committee produced up to six reports a year ranging from single evidence inquiries to more detailed examinations into Education, Schools and Family policy.

Stuart supports repealing the 2004 Hunting Act to bring back fox hunting, stating in 2010: "I've always said I would vote to reverse the ban".

In an interview with the journalist Peter Wilby for The Guardian, Stuart described himself as socially liberal, a "deficit hawk" who favours faster cuts to public spending, and an end to welfare dependency.

On 27 February 2016, Stuart announced his support for Britain continuing to be a member of the European Union.

He was appointed an Assistant Whip by the new Prime Minister, Theresa May on 18 July 2016. He was later promoted to serve as Parliamentary Under-Secretary of State for Exports in the January 2019 government reshuffle. He returned to the backbenches in the September 2021 reshuffle.

He was then appointed as a Trade Envoy to Vietnam, Cambodia and Laos in January 2022 and he held this role until July 2022.

He was made Minister of State at the Foreign, Commonwealth and Development Office in July 2022 as part of the caretaker government by outgoing Prime Minister Boris Johnson.

He was made Minister of State for Climate in September 2022 as part of the incoming cabinet of Prime Minister Liz Truss. In one of his first interviews in his new position with the BBC, Stuart commented that Oil and Gas Exploration in the North Sea would be "good for the environment". He attended Charles III's accession council on 10 September. He was formally appointed a privy counsellor three days later, granting him the honorific style The Right Honourable. On 19 October 2022, before a controversial vote on fracking that the government had declared a vote of confidence, Stuart suggested that the vote was not actually a confidence vote, apparently communicating a message from a "junior official at 10 Downing Street". The resulting confusion played a significant role in the resignation of Liz Truss the next day. On 27 October 2022, upon the appointment of Rishi Sunak as Prime Minister he was reappointed to his position and given the additional Energy portfolio but was removed from Cabinet. In 2023, reports emerged that Stuart had received  £10,000 donation towards his campaign from energy company JR Rix & Sons based out of Hull and an additional  £2,000 from Bostonair, an aviation company, also based out of Hull.

Personal life
Graham Stuart lives in Beverley and separated from his wife in January 2022. He enjoys motorcycling, cycling and cricket.

Notes

References

External links

Graham Stuart website

1962 births
Living people
People educated at Glenalmond College
Alumni of Selwyn College, Cambridge
Conservative Party (UK) MPs for English constituencies
UK MPs 2005–2010
UK MPs 2010–2015
UK MPs 2015–2017
UK MPs 2017–2019
UK MPs 2019–present
Members of the Privy Council of the United Kingdom